is a Japanese manga series written and illustrated by Dai Shiina. It was serialized in Hakusensha's shōjo manga magazine Hana to Yume from 2012 to 2020. Soredemo Sekai wa Utsukushii was first published as a one-shot in the same magazine in 2009, with a second one-shot published in 2011. It has been collected in 25 tankōbon volumes as of August 2020.

An anime television series adaptation by Pierrot aired on Nippon TV between April and June 2014.

Plot
Nike, the fourth princess of the Rain Dukedom, possesses the power to call forth the rain. She travels to the Sun Kingdom to marry Sun King Livius for the sake of her country, despite her own reluctance. She soon discovers that the King, who conquered the world in only three years after his ascendance to the throne, is still a child. Furthermore, for trivial reasons, he has demanded that Nike call forth the rain, and when she refuses, he has her thrown in jail. The story follows the two who, while at first are a married couple only in name, gradually begin to establish an emotional bond with one another.

Characters

Main characters

The fourth and youngest princess of the Rain Dukedom. She has the power to call forth the rain when she sings. She is sent, against her wishes (and because she lost a game of rock, paper, and scissor against her older sisters), to the Sun Kingdom to marry Sun King Livius so that her country can retain its autonomy. She discovers that the Sun King, who conquered the world in only three years after he ascended to the throne, is still a child. Although, initially distraught by her fate, Nike comes to love Livius and accepts her future as the "Sun Queen".
Optimistic, understanding, and stubborn but caring, Nike quickly gains the affection of the peoples as well as Livius, who clearly loves her. She is said to be more popular than Livius among the people in the Sun Kingdom as she seems to interact with them on regular basis and helps them out when she can. Nike is also very strong, as shown when she beat up four of the palace guards. She will also avenge herself, if she believe that any wrong has been done to her. For example, although Rani originally wanted to kill Nike and almost succeeded in doing so, Nike forgives him, but she also beats him up for carrying out the attempt on her life.

 Livius is the king of the Sun Kingdom. In the three years following his enthronement he was able to conquer the rest of the world. While he is rumored to be a monster of some sort, he is actually still a child. Although his father was the former king, his mother was a commoner. While she was still alive, the two of them lived an isolated life in the castle because of his mother's low social status. Livius began his campaign to take over the world after his mother's death. He has a loyal butler who seems to understand him.
His abilities as a king are considerable. Not only was he able to cleanse his kingdom's government of corruption soon after his coronation, but he then methodically defeated each opposing nation one by one. Nike has noted that although Livius is just a boy, his eyes are those of an adult. He granted the Rain Dukedom autonomy, but in exchange, he told them to send a princess to become his wife. Nike was sent to him and he is fond of her and grows to love her.

After his mother's death, Livius grew cold and cruel and became distrustful of everyone around him. Neil, his butler, stated that this is because he doesn't know how to reach out to people, a trait he developed because he was constantly surrounded by enemies while growing up. This came about because of his mother's low social status. He and his mother lived a quiet, isolated life in his father's palace and were only able to rely on each other for support. After his mother's death, Livius began to show his true potential and he flourished, not stopping the expansion of his influence until the world was conquered. In a way, his campaign can be seen as a diversion to distract him from the pain of his mother's death.
As the story progress, Nike's presence and efforts to help the young King slowly begin to change him. On several occasion in the series, Livius can be very childish. Livius can also be very protective and violent when people that he cares about are threatened. He didn't hesitate to raise his sword against a person who attacked Nike, although Nike stopped him from killing the man. Later on, Livius reveals that he still harbors a much colder and crueler and if not an extremely jealous side. He imprisoned his uncle Bardwin and confined Nike to her room because he thought that Bardwin had seduced Nike and that she had fallen for Bardwin. He even threatened to burn her home kingdom to ashes, when Nike talked against him for sending Bardwin to prison.

Neil is Livius's butler and tutor who often accompanies Livius during his travels. He seems to understand Livius and he cares about him a great deal. When Nike arrives it is he who provides her with pertinent information and helps her fit into her new life as Livius' prospective Queen.

Sun Kingdom

Bard (short for Bardwin) is Livius's uncle and the former Prime Minister of the Sun Kingdom until he fled mysteriously. Apart from that, he is also flirty and likes to tease Livius, causing the two to have a shaky relationship and to disagree a lot. After they manage to reestablish their relationship as family thanks to Nike, Livius reappoints Bard as the Prime Minister again.

Sheila is Livius's mother and consort of the former king of the Sun Kingdom. As she and her son were both discriminated by the people due to having a lower social status and coming from a "low-class", both of them lived a quiet life together until she died, which affected Livius's entire world.

Nike's personal maids who take joy in dressing her. They often tell her about the affairs in the castle.

Royal advisors of the Sun Kingdom.

The high priest from the Ministry of Priesthood of the Sun Kingdom and is in-charge of Livius's and Nike's marriage and engagement affairs.

The royal chef of the Sun Kingdom and head of the kitchens. He sometimes treats Nike to food despite Carl's insistence for her to lose weight.

The reporter of the Sun Kingdom's Royal Family Bulletin.

The Sun Kingdom's top designer. He has a firm belief that his designs will make anyone look beautiful and is mainly in charge of putting together Nike's ballgowns for prestigious occasions.

Rain Dukedom

Tohara is the previous sovereign of the Rain Dukedom, Nike's grandmother, and rain-summoning teacher. Even though Teteru is the reigning duke, Tohara is the true decision-maker, her words being law that even the royal family cannot go against.

Teteru is the reigning duke of the Rain Dukedom, Nike's father, and Tohara's son-in-law. The "Duke" is only a title, however, as Tohara is the true mastermind of the Rain Dukedom.

Iraha is Nike's mother and the daughter of Tohara. She has always been sickly and often seen on her sickbed.

Mira is Nike's oldest sister. She is the first princess of the Rain Dukedom & specializes in making rain.

Nia is Nike's second older sister. She is the second princess of the Rain Dukedom & specializes in making wind.

Kara is Nike's third older sister. She is the third princess of the Rain Dukedom & specializes in mentation (medicine).

 
Kitora is Nike's cousin. He lost his parents when he was a child, so he and Nike were raised together by Tohara. Kitora was unable to use his powers when he was a child and gave up quickly; he admires Nike for being able to push through hardships in order to be able to summon rain. It is implied that he has romantic feelings for Nike.

 
Aki is member of the royal family of the Rain Dukedom and Tohara's nephew.

Others

The first Princess of Sea Kingdom (with two older brothers) and Livius' childhood friend. Before, she was in love with Livius but realised that Nike was a more suitable match and is currently engaged to Marquiz Fortis, Duke of The Autonomous State of Fortis.

Media

Manga

Anime
Produced by Nippon Television, VAP, Hakusensha and Pierrot, the series is directed by Hajime Kamegaki, with  handling series composition, Ichirō Uno designing the characters and Kousuke Yamashita composing the music. The series aired on Nippon TV between April 6 and June 29, 2014. 

The opening theme is "BEAUTIFUL WORLD" by Joanna Koike, while the ending theme "PROMISE" and the insert song  performed by Rena Maeda. "Farewell Rain" in episode 12, sung by Nike's grandmother is performed by Chisa Yokoyama.

Episode list

References

External links
 Official manga website 
 Official anime website 
 

Adventure anime and manga
Anime series based on manga
Fantasy anime and manga
Hakusensha franchises
Hakusensha manga
Marriage in anime and manga
Nippon TV original programming
Pierrot (company)
Romance anime and manga
Sentai Filmworks
Shōjo manga